The Tigurini were a clan or tribe forming one out of four pagi (provinces) of the Helvetii. 
The Tigurini were the most important group of the Helvetii, mentioned by both Julius Caesar and Poseidonius, settling in the area of what is now the Swiss canton of Vaud, corresponding to the bearers of the late La Tène culture in western Switzerland. 
Their name has a meaning of "lords, rulers" (cognate with Irish tigern "lord"). The other Helvetian tribes included the Verbigeni and the Tougeni (sometimes identified with the Teutones), besides one tribe that has remained unnamed.

The name of the Tigurini is first recorded in the context of their alliance with the Cimbri in the Cimbrian War of 113–101 BCE. They crossed the  Rhine to invade Gaul in 109 BCE, moved south to the Roman region of Provence in 107 BCE and defeated a Roman army under Lucius Cassius Longinus near Agen. 
The Tigurini followed the Cimbri in their campaign across the Alps, but they did not enter Italy, instead remaining at the Brenner Pass. After the end of the war, they returned to their earlier homes, settling in the western Swiss plateau and the  Jura mountains north of Lake Leman. 
The names of the Tigurini and the Helvetii had retained a connotation of a "barbarian" threat from the north for the Romans, employed by Julius Caesar as a motivation for his expedition to Gaul by suggesting that these tribes were "on the move again". In 58 BCE the  Helvetii encountered the armies of Caesar, and were defeated and massacred in the battles of the Arar and the Bibracte, allegedly leaving 228,000 dead. These battles were the initial events in the Gallic Wars, fought between 58 and 49 BCE. 
After the Roman conquest, the Helvetii participated in the uprising of Vercingetorix in 52 BC, losing their status as foederati. As a means of asserting control over the military access routes to Gaul, the Romans established the Colonia Iulia Equestris at the site of the Helvetian settlement of Noviodunum (Nyon). There was still a fortified oppidum in  Bois de Châtel in the later 1st century BC, but it was destroyed in the early 1st century AD, its population presumably moving to the newly established Helvetian capital of Aventicum.
The Helvetii seem to have retained their  division into four pagi, and a certain autonomy, until the 60s AD. They supported Galba in the civil war following the death of Nero in AD 68. Their forces were routed at Bözberg Pass (Mount Vocetius) in AD 69. After this, the population was quickly romanized, losing its former tribal identity.

In the 16th century, humanist scholars associated the name of the Tigurini with the name of the city of Zürich (Latin Turicum).
Based on this, the city is sometimes referred to as Tigurum in Modern Latin contexts, such as the legend on coins minted in the city.
An example is a Zürich ducat dated 1646, inscribed with DUCATUS NOVUS REIPUBL. TIGURI.

See also
 Campaign history of the Roman military
 Mormont

Notes

Historical Celtic peoples
Tribes of pre-Roman Gaul
Gauls
Helvetii
Cimbrian War
Zürich
La Tène culture